Marco Zallmann (born November 17, 1967) is a German former professional footballer who played as a defender.

References

1967 births
Living people
East German footballers
German footballers
Association football defenders
Bundesliga players
1. FC Neubrandenburg 04 players
FC Hansa Rostock players
VfB Lübeck players
TSG Neustrelitz players
People from Neubrandenburg
Footballers from Mecklenburg-Western Pomerania